The Secretary General of the Caribbean Community is the Chief Executive Officer of the Community and the head of its principal administrative organ, the CARICOM Secretariat.

According to both the Original  and Revised  Treaty of Chaguaramas, the Secretary-General is appointed by the Conference of Heads of Government, on the recommendation of the Community Council of Ministers (and previously the Common Market Council in the Original Treaty), for a term not exceeding five years and may be reappointed by the Conference.

The Secretary-General, subject to the Organs of the Community and in accordance with various regulations, performs the following functions:
 representing the Community;
 developing, as mandated, decisions of competent Organs of the Community into implementable proposals;
 identifying and mobilising, as required, external resources to implement decisions at the regional level and undertake studies and develop decisions on relevant issues into implementable proposals;
 implementing, as mandated, decisions at the regional level for the achievement of Community objectives;
 implementing, with the consent of the Member State concerned, Community decisions which do not require legislative or administrative action by national authorities;
 monitoring and reporting on, as mandated, implementation of Community decisions;
 initiating or developing proposals for consideration and decision by the competent Organs in order to achieve Community objectives
 and such other functions assigned by the Conference or other competent Organs.

The current Secretary-General is Carla Barnett (Belize), who was elected in May 2021 to succeed Irwin LaRocque (Dominica; appointed in 2011) as secretary-general.

All Secretaries-General, including the Secretaries-General of CARIFTA, have resided at Colgrain House on Camp Street, Georgetown, Guyana.

Secretaries-General 

The second (and last) Secretary-General of CARIFTA, Mr. William Demas, became the first Secretary-General of the CARICOM. Mr. Demas had been instrumental in the transition from CARIFTA to the Caribbean Community, publishing a booklet in 1972 entitled "From CARIFTA to the Caribbean Community" wherein he outlined policies for deepening the integration process.

References 

Caribbean Community
Secretaries